The Benguela Railway is a Cape gauge railway line that runs through Angola from west to east, being the largest and most important railway line in the country. It also connects to Tenke in the Democratic Republic of the Congo (DRC), and to the Cape to Cairo Railway (connecting the city of Kindu (DRC) to the city of Port Elizabeth in South Africa).

The line terminates at the port of Lobito on the Atlantic coast, from where Angola exports a wide variety of products, including minerals (from the Copperbelt region), food, industrial components and livestock.

The section from Lobito to Luau is run by the Empresa do Caminho de Ferro de Benguela-E.P.  It crosses the Luao River, which lies on the border, to Dilolo (DRC). From there to Tenke, the railway is operated by the Société nationale des Chemins de fer du Congo.

Specifications
The railway is Cape gauge, which is used by most mainline railways in southern Africa. The maximum design speed is 90 km per hour. The design capacity is 20 million tons of cargo and 4 million passengers per year. There are 67 stations and 42 bridges along the route of the railway.

Equipment

Locomotives

History
The railway line roughly follows old trade routes between the ancient trading centre of Benguela and its hinterland of the Bié plateau. In 1899, the Portuguese government initiated the construction of the railway to give access to the central Angolan plateau and the mineral wealth of the then Congo Free State. A concession, running for 99 years, was granted to Sir Robert Williams on 28 November 1902. His Benguela Railway Company took over the construction which commenced on 1 March 1903. Messrs Pauling & Co. and Messrs Griffiths & Co were contracted to build sections of the railway. By 1914, when World War I started,  had been completed. Construction was halted until 1920 after which the railway's connection to Luau at the border to the Belgian Congo was completed in 1929. The primary purpose was to facilitate export trade, while "the domestic Angolan traffic would be of secondary importance."

Passenger trains also ran between Lubumbashi and Lobito, connecting with passenger ship services to Europe. This provided a shorter route for Europeans working in the Katangan and Zambian Copperbelt, and the name "Benguela Railway", or also "Katanga-Benguela railway", was sometimes used loosely to refer to the entire Lubumbashi–Lobito route, rather than the Tenke–Lobito section to which it strictly applies.

In its heyday, the Benguela Railway was the shortest way to transport mineral riches from the Congo to Europe. The line proved very successful and profitable, especially in the early 1970s after Zambia closed its border with the then Rhodesia. The railway reached an operational peak in 1973 when it transported 3.3 million tons of cargo, generated freight revenues of $30 million, and had 14,000 employees. Until the early 1970s, the railway was operated entirely by steam locomotives, oil-fired from the coast to Cubal, and then wood-fired from Cubal to the interior. Wood was supplied by eucalyptus trees grown on company-owned tree plantations. Steam locomotives outnumbered diesels as late as 1987.

Soon after Angola gained its independence from Portugal in 1975, the Angolan Civil War broke out. The railway was heavily damaged during the war and progressively fell into disuse. The workshops in Huambo were destroyed. Ballast cars had to be coupled to the front of locomotives to detonate mines. By 1992, only  of the railway remained in operation. When the 99-year concession expired in 2001, only  remained in service, along the coast from Benguela to Lobito.

Rehabilitation 
The railway was 90% owned by Tanganyika Concessions (Tanks), a London-based holding company. Société Générale de Belgique purchased a minority share in Tanks in 1923 and acquired a controlling interest in 1981. The Belgian company remained the controlling owner of the railway when the concession expired in 2001, at which point ownership of the railway passed to the Angolan government.

After the Angolan Civil War ended in 2002, the railway was reconstructed between 2006 and 2014 by the China Railway Construction Corporation at a cost of $1.83 billion. 100,000 Angolans were employed on the railway reconstruction. Trains reached Huambo in 2011, Kuito in 2012, and Luau near the Congolese border in 2013. The rebuilt railway was formally inaugurated in February 2015.

According to Jornal de Angola in May 2012, Empresa do Caminho de Ferro de Benguela-E.P. employed 1,321 workers, and transported 129,430 passengers and 5,640 tons of goods in 2011. Two trains per day run between Lobito and Benguela, one per week to Huambo, and three per week between Lobito and Cubal.

On 5 March 2018, ore transport was restarted from the Tenke Fungurume Mine, in the DRC, from where copper and cobalt are extracted, and the cargo transported to the port of Lobito. From that date the railway went into full operation, connecting the city of Tenke to the city of Lobito.

Accidents
In the Tolunda rail accident on 22 September 1994, damaged brakes caused a train to plunge into a canyon, killing 300.

See also

Congo Railway Company
History of rail transport in Angola
Luanda Railway
Moçâmedes Railway
Rail transport in Angola

References

Further reading
 Benguela Railway Company. (1929). A brief history of the Benguela railway, describing its construction through Angola, Portuguese West Africa, and the important role it is destined to play in the development of Southern and Central Africa. London: Benguela Railway Company.

External links
Early History
BBC report Lifeline to Angola's future
BBC report Looking back down the line
Unofficial timetable of passenger trains (Fahrplancenter)
2019 timetable
BBC2 footage of Benguela Railway from 'The Chinese are coming'
TANKS archive, University of Manchester Library

Railway lines in Angola
International railway lines
3 ft 6 in gauge railways in Angola
3 ft 6 in gauge railways in the Democratic Republic of the Congo
Railway lines in the Democratic Republic of the Congo
1929 establishments in the Belgian Congo